2016 AFF Invitational Futsal Club Championship was the second edition of AFF Futsal Club Championship. The tournament was held in Naypyidaw, Myanmar from 10 to 16 July 2016. The futsal clubs from AFF member countries were invited to compete in this tournament. Thai Port (men) and Thai Son Nam (women) were the title holders from the previous edition.

Participants

Men division

Women division

Venue 
All matches of 2016 AFF Futsal Club Championship were held in Sport Complex Indoor Stadium, commonly named Wunna Theikdi Indoor Stadium, in Naypyidaw, Myanmar.

Men division

Group stage

Third place match

Final

Winner

Women division

Group stage

Third place match

Final

Winner

References

External links
 AFF FUTSAL CLUB CHAMPIONSHIP 2016, aseanfootball.org

AFF Futsal Club Championship
2016 in Asian futsal
International sports competitions hosted by Myanmar
2016 in Burmese football
21st century in Naypyidaw
July 2016 sports events in Asia